Ernmas is an Irish mother goddess, mentioned in Lebor Gabála Érenn and "Cath Maige Tuired" as one of the Tuatha Dé Danann. Her daughters include the trinity of eponymous Irish goddesses Ériu, Banba and Fódla, the trinity of war goddesses the Badb, Macha and Anann (who is also called the Mórrígan), and also a trinity of sons, Glonn, Gnim, and Coscar.
Her other sons are Fiacha and Ollom. Ernmas was killed during the first battle of Mag Tuired and is called a "she-farmer" in the Lebor Gabála Érenn.

References

Irish goddesses
Mother goddesses
Tuatha Dé Danann